Sir Walford Harmood Montague Selby  (19 May 1881 – 7 August 1965) was a British civil servant and diplomat.

Career
Selby was educated at Charterhouse School and Christ Church, Oxford, and joined the Diplomatic Service in 1904 as an attaché. He served in Berlin and The Hague where he was on the Secretariat of the Peace Conference in 1907. He returned to the Foreign Office in London in 1908. He was on the staff of Lord Rosebery when he made a special visit to Vienna to announce the accession of King George V in 1910. After that Selby was secretary to the committee preparing for George V's coronation, and was a Gold Staff Officer (assistant to the Earl Marshal) at the actual coronation in 1911. He was assistant private secretary to Sir Edward Grey, the Foreign Secretary, 1911–15, and private secretary to Lord Robert Cecil, Parliamentary Under-Secretary of State for Foreign Affairs, 1915–18. He wanted to join the army but the Foreign Office would not release him until 1918 when he was able to join the Grenadier Guards shortly before the war ended. He then returned to the Foreign Office and was First Secretary in the High Commission at Cairo 1919–22; Principal Private Secretary to the Foreign Secretary 1924–32; envoy to Austria 1933–37; and ambassador to Portugal 1937–40.

Honours
Walford Selby was appointed MVO in 1911 and raised to CVO in 1924. He was appointed CB in the New Year Honours of 1926 and knighted KCMG in the King's Birthday Honours of 1931.

Publications
[https://books.google.com/books?id=iS5nAAAAMAAJ Diplomatic Twilight: 1930–1940], Murray, 1953

References
SELBY, Sir Walford Harmood Montague, Who Was Who, A & C Black, 1920–2008; online edn, Oxford University Press, Dec 2012
Obituary: Sir Walford Selby: Diplomatist Of The Old School, The Times, London, 9 August 1965, page 10
Sir Walford Selby (obituary), The Glasgow Herald'', 9 August 1965

External links

Catalogue of the papers of Sir Walford Selby, 1900–65, with family papers, 15th–20th cent., Bodleian Library, University of Oxford

1881 births
1965 deaths
People educated at Charterhouse School
Alumni of Christ Church, Oxford
Principal Private Secretaries to the Secretary of State for Foreign and Commonwealth Affairs
Ambassadors of the United Kingdom to Austria
Ambassadors of the United Kingdom to Portugal
Knights Commander of the Order of St Michael and St George
Companions of the Order of the Bath
Commanders of the Royal Victorian Order
Members of HM Diplomatic Service
20th-century British diplomats